NCAA independent lacrosse schools are four-year institutions in the United States that do not belong to a lacrosse-only conference or a primary all-sports conference that sponsors lacrosse. As of the 2016–17 academic year there are 22 men's and 9 women's lacrosse programs in Division I, Division II, and Division III that compete as independents.

Division I

Men's 
The only team playing as an independent in the upcoming 2023 season is Hartford, which began a transition from Division I to Division III in the 2021–22 school year. The 2022–23 school year, in which Hartford's entire athletic program (except men's and women's golf) is independent, is the last for Hartford in Division I, as it will join the D-III Commonwealth Coast Conference in July 2023.

Women's 
Four schools will compete as D-I independents in the 2023 season. As noted above, Hartford will be a full independent in its final D-I season before moving to D-III in July 2023. San Diego State and UC Davis became independents after the 2021 season, when their former women's lacrosse home of the Mountain Pacific Sports Federation shut down its league due to a lack of sponsoring members. Both will join Pac-12 Conference women's lacrosse after the 2023 season. Xavier will play its inaugural women's lacrosse season as an independent before starting play in its full-time home of the Big East Conference in 2024.

Division II

Women's

Division III

Men's

Women's

See also
 College lacrosse
 NCAA Independents

References

External links
 NCAA Lacrosse

NCAA lists
Indep
NCAA independent schools